Chokher Bali ( sand in the eye,  constant irritant) is a 2003 Indian Bengali language drama film based on the 1903 novel Chokher Bali by Rabindranath Tagore. It was directed by Rituparno Ghosh in 2003 and stars Aishwarya Rai as Binodini and Raima Sen as Ashalata. Ashalata and Binodini refer to each other as Chokher Bali. The other major characters are played by Prosenjit Chatterjee as Mahendra, Lily Chakravarty as Rajlakshmi, the mother of Mahendra, Tota Roy Chowdhury as Behari, Rajlakshmi's adopted son and Swastika Mukherjee in a cameo role. The film was later dubbed into Hindi and was released internationally in that language.

Upon release, Chokher Bali met with critical review and positive box office reception.

Chokher Bali won the National Film Award for Best Feature Film in Bengali, National film award for best costume design and National film award for best art direction. It was nominated for the Golden Leopard (Best Film) award at the Locarno International Film Festival in 2003. The film screened at the 34th International Film Festival of India on 19 October. It was the Official Selection at the Chicago International Film Festival in 2003 and was showcased in over 25 international festivals including the Toronto International Film Festival, London Film Festival, Palm Springs, Karlovy Vary and Washington DC International Film Festival besides winning the Apsara Film Producers' Award for the Best Regional Film 2004. Aishwarya Rai had won the Best Actress award at the Anandalok Awards 2003.

Plot
Binodini is a young girl who is left to her own devices when her sickly husband dies soon after their marriage. She returns to her village and lives there for a couple of months until she sees one of her aunts passing by. Binodini hails the woman and her two sons agree that it would be best if Binodini came to live with the woman and her son, Mahendra. But that son, Mahendra, was one of the first to see Binodini's photo when she was proposed as a prospective wife for him, yet refused her on account of his being "unready for marriage." When Binodini arrives with her aunt, Mahendra and his new bride are constantly sneaking off to be alone together. This infatuation does not last long, however, and Mahendra soon begins to see that Binodini is more his type.  Mahendra and Binodini, start an affair, and this is soon revealed to Ashalata, who, unaware of her pregnancy, leaves for Kashi. Binodini, after realising that Mahendra is self-obsessed, leaves Mahendra's house. She pleads with Behari to marry her, but Behari, true to his values, rejects her offer. Binodini leaves the town for her village. She writes a letter to Behari that she'll be waiting for him in Kashi. As she is leaving for Kashi, Mahendra comes to mend their relations, which she refuses. Instead she makes him promise to take her to Behari. At Kashi, Binodini meets Behari who, after some incidents, agrees to marry her. On the day of marriage Binodini vanishes, leaving a letter for Asha. The story details the lives of these three and Mahendra's best friend as they deal with issues such as distrust, adultery, lies, and falling-out.

Soundtrack

The film's background score is by Debojyoti Mishra and, notably, it contains no playback singing. Sreela Majumdar dubbed for Aishwarya Rai and Sudipta Chakraborty dubbed for Raima Sen.

Culture 

In olden days in Bengal, women and girls who were best friends would often set a common nickname for themselves and address each other by that name. In this story, two friends Binodini and Ashalata call each other 'Chokher Bali.'

Cast
Aishwarya Rai as Binodini (Voice dubbed by Sreela Majumdar) 
Prosenjit Chatterjee as Mahendra
Raima Sen as Ashalata (Voice dubbed by Sudipta Chakraborty)
Lily Chakravarty as Rajlakshmi, Mahendra's mother
Tota Roy Chowdhury as Behari
 Shuchita Roychowdhury as Annapurna, Ashalata's maternal aunt
Mousumi Saha as Swarna
Tina Dutta as Manorama
Ratna Ghoshal the Woman accompanying the English missionary
Swastika Mukherjee as a young Courtesan 
Anindya Chatterjee and Upal Sengupta occur as the students
Sudeshna Roy as Kamal

Critical reception
Aishwarya received critical acclaim for her performance as Binodini.
In Anandabazar Patrika, Chandril Bhattacharya praised the film for its direction, screenplay, background score, sound design, cinematography, production design as well as the dubbing by Sudipta Chakraborty. Ekanshu Khera of Planet Bollywood gave the film an 8/10. He found the cinematography to be beautiful and was pleased that the singing was not lip synched. However, he said that the "dubbing leaves much to be desired" and would have preferred a different director dub it in Hindi. He also noted that the film appeals "to a niche audience due to its periodic settings and ideologies." Margaret Pomeranz of ABC Australia gave it 3 out of 5 stars, saying that "the insight it gives into Indian culture and customs, is interesting and that tends to overcome the slight impatience with the overload of emotions." David Stratton, also of ABC, gave the film 3.5 out of 5 stars, commenting on how the film version was edited 40 minutes shorter but that it was beautifully acted and fascinating.

Box office
The film was declared a hit at the box office.

Other titles
Chokher Bali: A Passion Play (International: English title)
Sand in the Eye (India: English title)

References

External links

citwf.com page

2000s Bengali-language films
2003 films
Bengali-language Indian films
Films set in Kolkata
Films based on Indian novels
Films based on works by Rabindranath Tagore
Memorials to Rabindranath Tagore
Films about women in India
Films directed by Rituparno Ghosh
Films whose production designer won the Best Production Design National Film Award
Films that won the Best Costume Design National Film Award
Best Bengali Feature Film National Film Award winners